Brandon Transit is the municipally operated bus service in Brandon; the second largest city in the province of Manitoba, Canada.

Ridership in 2017 was over 1,000,000 passengers or 19,500 per week. Prior to the realignment of routes, the Victoria East and Richmond West had the highest ridership.

History 
Public transportation began in the city in 1913 when the Brandon Municipal Railway started their streetcar service, with bus operations being introduced in 1932 after the MacArthur Transportation Company Limited assumed the service. Brandon Transit started up in 1955, initially with a private operator, which the city took over two years later.

Services
Fixed bus routes and Handi-Transit operate seven days a week.

Regular Routes
On July 31, 2017, Brandon Transit overhauled its existing route system. All former routes, except for Route 4 (Trans Canada), were replaced with more downtown-centric routes, and Route 4 was modified, its main change being that it now returns to the Downtown Terminal via the 1st Street Bridge instead of Braecrest Ave and the 18th Street Bridge.

The former routes, used since 2002, were as follows:

Handi-Transit
Handi-Transit Service provides door-to-door transportation for passengers with a disability who are unable to use the regular bus service. Clients must be registered to make use of the service.

UPass 
All members of the Brandon University Students' Union (on the Brandon campus) and Assiniboine Community College Student Association receive an annual Universal Bus Pass (UPass) through their student card.

Bio-diesel project
Originally this was a demonstration project to test one bus using fuel made entirely from waste restaurant fryer oil; the bus was running on 100% bio-diesel with no petro-diesel at all. Now that the feasibility has been proven, the goal was to eventually operate part of the fleet only using city restaurant waste products.

The Bio-Diesel test was discontinued in 2009 when the demonstration unit caught fire. The fire was not related to the Bio-diesel, it was revealed to be an electrical fire. This bus was also the last Orion I in service.

Facilities

Transit Operations
Address: 900 Richmond Avenue East
Coordinates: 
Facilities: Head office and bus maintenance

Information Centre
Address: 800 Rosser Avenue
Coordinates: 
Facilities: Information, maps, tickets, passes, etc.

Downtown Bus Mall
Address: 8th Street, between Rosser Ave and Pacific Ave.
Coordinates: 
Facilities: shelters, benches 
Bus bays: 8

Richmond Terminal
Address: Richmond Avenue, west of 18th Street
Coordinates: 
Facilities: shelters, benches
Bus bays: 4

See also

 Public transport in Canada

References

External links
Brandon Transit
Brandon Transit Rider's Guide

Transit agencies in Manitoba
Transport in Brandon, Manitoba